Winterton is a town in North Lincolnshire, England,  north-east of Scunthorpe. The 2021 census found 4,765 inhabitants living in the town.

As of 2022, the mayor of Winterton is Marilynne Harrison.

History

Winterton has a history going back to Roman times and several large mosaic floors and other Roman remains have been found there.

She was of high status, as evidenced by the high quality of the coffin made from a single block of limestone and she was also found to be laid on a sheet of lead. Down the hill from this spot are the remains of one of the Winterton Roman villas, which is famous for its mosaic pavements where it is most likely she lived.

Both Winterton and neighbouring Winteringham seem to contain mention of  Winter or Wintra, the first of the kings of Lindsey with any pretence to an historical basis (after the mythological Woden). The position of the two settlements on the south bank of the Humber, close to the point where the main Roman road from the south reaches the river, may be significant, as it is the obvious point from where the settlement of Lindsey is likely to have originated.

Winterton Agricultural Show 
The Winterton Agricultural Society was formed in 1872 to further the interests of a rapidly modernising agricultural community. For many years the society held a two-day Agricultural Show and sports in the town.

Today, the two day show occupies over 20 acres, which the society now owns to accommodate the growing demand for trade stands, sideshows and entertainment. The show caters for many agricultural and countryside pursuits involving all elements of the local and neighbouring communities. It successfully blends a variety of events appealing to both rural and town dwellers; as a consequence it is very well supported, drawing crowds in excess of twelve thousand from across the region.

Toponymy

The village's name is thought to mean the ‘farmstead, the village or the estate of the Winteringas ', who were perhaps followers or dependants of someone called Winter or Wintra. In the Domesday Book of 1086 the place is called variously Wintrintune, once; Wintrintone, four times; Wintritone, twice and Wintretune, once.

Notable people
 Wallace Sargent – Former director of the Palomar Observatory, he was one of the world's foremost astronomers and a leading academic at the California Institute of Technology. Born in nearby Elsham, he attended school at Winterton Comprehensive School
 Neville Tong – cyclist
 William Fowler – (1761–1832); artist, architect and builder

Twinning
Winterton has been twinned with:
 Saffré, France - since 1993.

See also
Winterton Community Academy

References

External links

Winterton Rangers Football Club

 
Towns in Lincolnshire
Civil parishes in Lincolnshire
Borough of North Lincolnshire